Sumuru is a supervillainess protagonist of the 1946 radio series Shadow of Sumuru (1946), and subsequent novels by Sax Rohmer.

Sumuru may also refer to:
 Šumuru, one of the eight great clans of Manchu nobility
 Sumuru (2003 film), a 2003 sci-fi film
 The Akkadian name for Sumur, a Phoenician city in the Levant

See also